Haemoproteus plataleae is a species of parasitic alveolate eukaryotes that infects ibises and spoonbills. It has been recovered from adult and juvenile American white ibises in Florida.

References

Haemosporida
Species described in 1935
Poultry diseases
Veterinary protozoology
Parasites of birds